Qiajik (also Romanized as Qīājīk; also known as Qayeh Jīk) is a village in Shahsavan Kandi Rural District, in the Central District of Saveh County, Markazi Province, Iran. At the 2006 census, its population was 43, in 11 families.

References 

Populated places in Saveh County